Polonium trioxide (also known as polonium(VI) oxide) is a chemical compound with the formula PoO3. It is one of three oxides of polonium, the other two being polonium monoxide (PoO) and polonium dioxide (PoO2). It is an interchalcogen that has so far only been detected in trace amounts.

Preparation
It has been reported that trace quantities of polonium trioxide form during the anodic deposition of polonium from acidic solutions. Although there is no experimental evidence for this, the fact that the deposit dissolves in hydrogen peroxide suggests that it contains polonium in a high oxidation state. It has been predicted that polonium trioxide may be formed by heating polonium dioxide and chromium trioxide together in air.

Difficulty of preparation of polonium(VI) compounds
It is very difficult to oxidize polonium beyond Po(IV); for example, the only hexahalide of polonium is the hexafluoride, PoF6, and fluorine is already the most electronegative element (though polonium hexaiodide was once reportedly formed in the vapour phase, it immediately decomposed). However, the difficulty in obtaining polonium trioxide and polonates (containing the  anion, analogous to sulfate, selenate, and tellurate) by direct oxidation of Po(IV) compounds may be due to the fact that polonium-210, while the most easily available isotope of polonium, is strongly radioactive. Similar work with curium shows that it is easier to achieve higher oxidation states with longer-lived isotopes; thus, it may be easier to obtain Po(VI) (especially polonium trioxide) using the longer-lived polonium-208 or polonium-209.

References

Polonium compounds
Oxides
Interchalcogens